Schier or Šír is a European-origin surname. Notable people with the surname include:

 Alexander F. Schier (born 1964), Swiss cell biologist
 František Šír (1914-?), Czech rower
 Jaroslav Šír (born 1923), Czech skier
 Ruth Eisemann-Schier (born 1942), Honduran criminal
 Steven E. Schier (born 1952), political scientist
 Val Schier (born 1950), Australian mayor
 Vladislav Schier or Vladislav Šír (1830–1889), Czech physician and naturalist

Places
 Schiermonnikoog